DocuWare is cloud-based Software as a Service (SaaS) provider. DocuWare software provides document management, repository, and workflow automation functions (also referred to as enterprise content management (ECM) or content services).

The company is headquartered in Germany and the United States.

DocuWare is also the name of the flagship product offered by the company. In addition to being offered as cloud-based Software as a Service (SaaS), it is also available with feature parity for installation on-premises. The software is available in 22 languages. DocuWare is distributed via a global network of 500 authorized DocuWare partners (ADP) as well as directly to key accounts. As of November 2022, DocuWare is used by 15,000 customers in more than 100 countries.

Company history 
On October 27, 1988, DOCUNET GmbH was founded in Germering, Germany (near Munich) by President Jürgen Biffar. Since 1990, Biffar has been managing the company with his colleague, Thomas Schneck. DOCUNET AG was renamed to DocuWare AG in August 2000.

Since 1999, DocuWare has outsourced parts of its development to Sofia, Bulgaria. As of 2016, Nemetschek OOD had 42 employees working on the DocuWare product. DocuWare GmbH holds a 20 percent stake in Nemetschek OOD.

In April 2012, an investment agreement was signed between the company and Morgan Stanley Expansion Capital LP, a Morgan Stanley Investment Management private equity fund. Its aim was promoting and accelerating the global growth of DocuWare. The legal form, AG (Public Holding Company) changed to GmbH (limited liability corporation).

The company acquired U.S.-based Westbrook Technologies Inc., developer of Fortis ECM software in August 2013. In 2014, Westbrook Technologies Inc. was merged into DocuWare Corporation.

At the beginning of 2016 DocuWare appointed Dr Michael Berger as its Chief Technology Officer (CTO). Dr Berger joined the company in 2008 as Vice President Research & Development.

On January 1, 2019 Jürgen Biffar and Thomas Schneck stepped back from their operational roles after 30 years, and Dr. Michael Berger and Max Ertl started their new roles as co-presidents.

On August 6, 2019 DocuWare was acquired by Ricoh. DocuWare continues to operate as a standalone subsidiary of Ricoh.

In 2020, the company received approval to move its U.S. headquarters from New Windsor to Beacon, New York.

Subsidiaries 
 DocuWare Corporation (Beacon, NY), founded January 1, 2001
 DocuWare Ltd (Nottinghamshire), founded April 1, 2005
 DocuWare SARL (Paris), founded September 1, 2008
 DocuWare S.L. (Barcelona), founded July 1, 2009

Product history 
1988 – Development of a DACS-Board (DACS = Document Archiving and Communication System)

1990 – DACS Office, first software solution running on Windows 3.0 to store, search, display and print documents (Windows 3.0: Released May 22, 1990)

1993 – DocuWare 3.0, customizable file cabinets, structure not pre-set; Sending of documents out of DocuWare

1998 – DocuWare 4.0, first 32-Bit Version

2006 – DocuWare 5.0, new development based on .NET technology

2008 – DocuWare Web Client, web-based document management

2009 – DocuWare SaaS, first SaaS via private cloud

2012 – DocuWare Online, first SaaS via public cloud

2013 – DocuWare 6.0, a completely web-based ECM

2014 – DocuWare Online was renamed to DocuWare Cloud and ported to Microsoft Azure Platform

2018 – DocuWare 7.0, with performance and interface updates

Certifications 
ISO 9001
ISO 27001
SOC 2
IDW ERS FAIT 3
HIPAA-compliant

Awards 
BLI — 2022 Document Imaging Software Pick and Outstanding Innovation Award
Cannata Report — 2021 Frank Award for Best ECM Provider
Cannata Report — 2020 Frank Award for Best ECM Provider
Keypoint Intelligence - Buyers Lab (BLI) - 2018 Outstanding Content & Workflow Management Platform
Buyers Laboratory Inc. (BLI) - 2014 5-Star Rated for Product and Program Version 6 Online 
Buyers Laboratory Inc. (BLI) - 2013 5-Star Rated for Product and Program Version 6 and wins Summer Pick Award Outstanding Document Management Solution

See also
Document Management
Enterprise Content Management
Records Management

References

External links

Document management systems
Software companies of Germany
Cloud computing